South Central Bell Telephone Company, headquartered in Birmingham, Alabama, was the name of the Bell System's operations in Alabama, Kentucky, Louisiana, Mississippi, and Tennessee.  South Central Bell was created in  July 1968 when the Bell telephone operations in those states were split off from Southern Bell. South Central Bell was headquartered in (what is now) the AT&T City Center building in Birmingham.

In 1984, South Central Bell became a subsidiary of BellSouth Corporation, effectively reuniting South Central Bell with Southern Bell. The two companies were officially reunited in 1992 when Southern Bell absorbed South Central Bell as BellSouth Telecommunications. The two names were used, however, until 1995.

See also
AT&T
AT&T Corporation, now a subsidiary
BellSouth Telecommunications
 

Bell System
Telecommunications companies of the United States
AT&T subsidiaries
Companies based in Birmingham, Alabama
Defunct companies based in Alabama
Defunct telecommunications companies of the United States
Economy of the Southeastern United States
Telecommunications companies established in 1968
American companies disestablished in 1992
American companies established in 1968
Telecommunications companies disestablished in 1992